Iravadia is a genus of very small, somewhat amphibious land snails that have a gill and an operculum, semi-terrestrial gastropod mollusks or micromollusk  in the family Iravadiidae.

These tiny snails live in damp habitat (under rotting vegetation) that is very close to the edge of the sea; they can tolerate being washed with saltwater during especially high tides. These snails are listed as freshwater snails by Vaught (1989).

Taxonomy
William Thomas Blanford established the genus Iravadia within the family Rissoidae in 1867.

Species
Species within the genus Iravadia include:
 Iravadia angulata (Laseron, 1956)
 Iravadia bombayana (Stoliczka, 1868)
 Iravadia capitata (Laseron, 1956)
 Iravadia carpentariensis (Hedley, 1912)
 Iravadia cochinchinensis (Bavay & Dautzenberg, 1910)
 † Iravadia dolini Lozouet, 2003
 Iravadia elongata (Hornung & Mermod, 1928)
 Iravadia goliath (Laseron, 1956)
 Iravadia ornata Blanford, 1867 - type species of the genus Iravadia
 Iravadia pilbara Golding, 2014
 Iravadia quadrasi (O. Boettger, 1893)
 Iravadia quadrina (Laseron, 1956)
 Iravadia rohdei (Brandt, 1968)
 Iravadia tenella Bavay & Dautzenberg, 1912
 Iravadia tenuilirata (Boettger, 1893)
Species brought into synonymy
 Iravadia annandalei Preston, 1916: synonym of Iravadia ornata Blanford, 1867
 Iravadia aristaei (Melvill, 1912): synonym of Pseudonoba aristaei (Melvill, 1912)
 Iravadia atemeles (Melvill, 1912): synonym of Pseudonoba atemeles (Melvill, 1896)
 Iravadia australis Hedley, 1900: synonym of Pellamora australis (Hedley, 1901)
 Iravadia bella (A. Adams, 1853): synonym of Iravadia delicata (Philippi, 1849)
 Iravadia delicata (Philippi, 1849): synonym of Pseudonoba delicata (Philippi, 1849)
 Iravadia densilabrum (Melvill, 1912): synonym of Pellamora densilabrum (Melvill, 1912)
 Iravadia elegantula (A. Adams, 1861): synonym of Fluviocingula elegantula (A. Adams, 1861)
 Iravadia ennurensis Preston, 1916: synonym of Iravadia ornata Blanford, 1867
 Iravadia expansilabrum Ponder, 1984: synonym of Pseudonoba expansilabrum (Ponder, 1984) (original combination)
 Iravadia funerea Preston, 1916: synonym of Iravadia ornata Blanford, 1867
 Iravadia gemmata Ponder, 1984: synonym of Pseudonoba gemmata (Ponder, 1984)
 Iravadia ictriella (Melvill, 1910): synonym of Pseudonoba ictriella (Melvill, 1910)
 Iravadia inflata (Ponder, 1967): synonym of Pseudonoba inflata (Ponder, 1967)
 Iravadia mahimensis (Melvill, 1893): synonym of Pseudomerelina mahimensis (Melvill, 1893)
 Iravadia nipponica (Kuroda & Habe, 1954): synonym of Fluviocingula nipponica Kuroda & Habe, 1954
 Iravadia padangensis (Thiele, 1925): synonym of Pseudonoba padangensis (Thiele, 1925)
 Iravadia princeps Preston, 1915: synonym of Iravadia ornata Blanford, 1867
 Iravadia profundior Ponder, 1984: synonym of Pseudonoba profundior (Ponder, 1984) (originam combination)
 Iravadia resima (Laseron, 1956): synonym of Fluviocingula resima (Laseron, 1956)
 Iravadia reticulata Brandt, 1968: synonym of Iravadia quadrasi (O. Boettger, 1893)
 Iravadia sakaguchii (Kuroda & Habe, 1954): synonym of Wakauraia sakaguchii (Kuroda & Habe, 1954)
 Iravadia sublevis (Laseron, 1956): synonym of Pseudonoba sublevis (Laseron, 1956)
 Iravadia subquadrata (Laseron, 1950): synonym of Pseudonoba subquadrata (Laseron, 1950)
 Iravadia trochlearis (Gould, 1861): synonym of Stosicia annulata (Dunker, 1859)
 Iravadia tuberculata Brandt, 1974: synonym of Iravadia mahimensis (Melvill, 1893)
 Iravadia yendoi (Yokoyama, 1927): synonym of Pseudonoba yendoi (Yokoyama, 1927)

References

External links
 Blanford W. T. (1867). Contributions to Indian Malacology, No. VIII. List of Estuary shells collected in the delta of the Irawady, in Pegu, with descriptions of the new species. Journal of the Asiatic Society of Bengal. 36(2): 51-72, pl. 2
 Ponder W. F. (1984) A review of the genera of the Iravadiidae (Gastropoda: Rissoacea) with an assessment of the relationships of the Family. Malacologia 25(1): 21-71

Iravadiidae
Gastropod genera